The Keiser Report was a financial news and analysis show on RT UK and the  Russian state RT network, hosted by Max Keiser and Stacy Herbert, a married couple. It  ran from September 2009 to February 2022, with three new shows every week. Herbert is the co-host; she bantered with Keiser on headlines and commentary. It was produced by the Associated Press.

The Independent described the show as "mischievously seditious" and Keiser as "America's most outrageous political pundit".

An episode broadcast in September 2011 featured an interview with the comedian Roseanne Barr, who stated that her solution to the financial crisis was to "bring back the guillotine".

On February 24, 2022, Keiser quit the show after 1819 episodes in response to the 2022 Russian invasion of Ukraine.

On June 30, 2022, Max and Stacy rebooted their show on Youtube albeit renamed to Max & Stacy Report. It uses the same format and runtime as the original Keiser Report on RT and has frequent new episodes uploaded weekly.

References

2009 British television series debuts
News agencies based in the United Kingdom
Financial news agencies
RT (TV network) original programming
British television news shows